Damon may refer to:

Places in the United States
 Damon, Illinois, an unincorporated community
 Damon, Missouri, a ghost town
 Damon, Texas, a census-designated place
 Damon, Virginia, an unincorporated community
 Lake Damon, Florida
 Damon Marsh, Oakland, California
 Potsdam Municipal Airport, Potsdam, New York, also known as Damon Field

People and fictional characters
 Damon (given name), a list of people and fictional characters
 Damon (surname)

Other uses
 Damon (TV series), a sitcom starring Damon Wayans
 Damon Records, a record label
 Damon (arachnid), a genus of whip spiders
 Damon Prison, an Israeli prison near Haifa

See also
 Damon House (disambiguation)